Wiconisco is a census-designated place in Wiconisco Township, Dauphin County, Pennsylvania, United States. Its location is just north of U.S. Route 209 and the borough of Lykens. As of the 2010 census the population was 921.

History
A post office has been in operation at Wiconisco since 1835. The community took its name from Wiconisco Creek.

References

External links

Census-designated places in Dauphin County, Pennsylvania
Census-designated places in Pennsylvania